Hakea macraeana, commonly known as the willow needlewood or Macrae's hakea, is a species of shrub native to eastern Australia. The species was first formally described by botanist Ferdinand von Mueller in 1886 in the Australian Journal of Pharmacy. The species name honours one George Macrae, who aided the original collector William Baeuerlen.

The white or cream-white inflorescences appear along the stems from August to October, and are composed of two to six individual small flowers. Flowering is followed by the development of oval-shaped woody seed pods.

A population from Dorrigo in northern New South Wales has since been classified as a separate species H. ochroptera. Hakea macraeana is an understory plant of sclerophyll forest on rocky soils. The species' response to bushfire is unknown.

Rarely cultivated, the willow needlewood has potential as a screening plant. It adapts readily to cultivation and is tolerant of light or heavy soils. Faring better in climates of over  annual rainfall, Hakea macraeana is tolerant of moderate frosts.

References

macraeana
Flora of New South Wales
Plants described in 1886
Taxa named by Ferdinand von Mueller